Endless Road is an album by Tommy Emmanuel.

Endless Road may also refer to:

The Endless Road, a 1943 German film
Endless Road, 7058, an album by Auryn
Endless Road, a 1985 song by the Dutch band Time Bandits